The First Methodist Church is a historic church at the junction of Chestnut and 4th Streets, NW corner in Lewisville, Arkansas.  The single story brick building was designed by Witt, Seibert & Company of Texarkana and built in 1913.  It is distinctive as one of the only church buildings to survive from Lewisville's period of economic prosperity during the lumber boom, and as an Akron Plan design with Classical Revival features.

The building was listed on the National Register of Historic Places in 1996.

See also
National Register of Historic Places listings in Lafayette County, Arkansas

References

Methodist churches in Arkansas
Churches on the National Register of Historic Places in Arkansas
Neoclassical architecture in Arkansas
Churches completed in 1913
Churches in Lafayette County, Arkansas
1913 establishments in Arkansas
National Register of Historic Places in Lafayette County, Arkansas
Neoclassical church buildings in the United States